Anokhi Ada (Hindi: अनोखी अदा, Unique Style) is a 1948 romantic  Hindi film directed by Mehboob Khan. The story was by Zia Sarhadi, with screenplay and dialogue by Agha Jani Kashmiri. The music composer was Naushad, assisted by Ghulam Mohammed and the lyricists were Shakeel Badayuni and Anjum Pilibhiti. The director of photography was Faredoon Irani. It was produced under the Mehboob Productions banner and starred Naseem Banu, Surendra, Prem Adib, Zeb Qureshi, Reehan, Pratima Devi and Cuckoo.

The story was a romantic triangle involving Surendra and Prem Adib as the two men in love with Naseem Banu, who played the role of a woman suffering from amnesia.

Plot

Prakash and his older sister (Naseem Banu) live a poor life, and are unable to pay their rent. Laat saheb (Prem Adib) is from a rich family, but having left home, lives as  a poor homeless man. He tries to help the brother and sister get something to eat. He ventures out during curfew time and is caught by the police, but is able to hand the food to the brother and sister.  The sister develops a soft spot for Laat Saheb. However, the neighbours insist that she be put out of her house as she is having a clandestine affair with Latt saheb. When Prakash dies due to an accident, his sister thinks of moving from their rented accommodation. Travelling by train, she again meets up with Laat saheb, who is going to see his unwell mother. During the journey he lets her know that he loves her, much to her joy. The train they are in meets with an accident and she is presumed dead. She ends up in a hospital where she meets Professor Nath (Surendra), who takes her home as she has lost her memory. He renames her Kamini and blocks any means of her regaining her memory since he's fallen in love with her, and does not want to lose her. Laat saheb re-enters her life and tries to help her remember her past. Finally, she regains her memory and goes off with Laat saheb, leaving the Professor behind.

Cast
 Naseem as Kamini
Surendra as Professor Nath
Prem Adib as Laatsaheb
Zeb Qureshi as Mirch
Reehan
Pratima Devi (Hindi Actress) as Laatsaheb's mother  
Murad as Laatsaheb's father
Cuckoo as Stage Dancer
Bhudo Advani
Amir Banoo
Wasker
Abdul
Haroon
Nawab
Master Ghulam Mohamed

Music
The music direction was by Naushad and the two lyricists were Shakeel Badayuni and Anjum Pilibhiti. The songs were sung by Surendra, Mukesh, Shamshad Begum and Uma Devi (Tun Tun).  The film had memorable numbers which became popular, like "Kyun Unhe Dil Diya", sung by Surendra and Shamshad Begum. Mukesh was pitted against Surendra, who had a big success with Anmol Ghadi (1946). However, Mukesh, giving playback to Prem Adib, sang some appealing songs like the ghazal "Kabhi Dil Se Dil Takrata Toh Hoga".

Song List

References

External links

1948 films
1940s Hindi-language films
Films directed by Mehboob Khan
Indian romantic musical films
1940s romantic musical films
Indian black-and-white films